Septoria fragariae is a fungal plant pathogen affecting strawberries.

See also
 List of strawberry diseases

References

External links
 Index Fungorum
 USDA ARS Fungal Database

fragariae
Fungi described in 1842
Fungal strawberry diseases
Taxa named by John Baptiste Henri Joseph Desmazières